Harold Gonsalves (January 28, 1926 – April 15, 1945) was a United States Marine Corps private first class who was killed in action during the Battle of Okinawa in World War II. He was awarded the nation's highest military award for valor, the Medal of Honor, posthumously, for his heroic action on April 15, 1945.

Early years
Gonsalves, a Mexican-American, was born in Alameda, California, on January 28, 1926. He attended school there and after two and one-half years of high school, quit to take a job as a stock clerk with Montgomery Ward in Oakland. In high school, Gonsalves had taken part in football, baseball, track, and swimming. He also sang tenor in the school glee club.

World War II

U.S. Marine Corps
Gonsalves enlisted in the Marine Corps Reserve on May 27, 1943, and was called to active duty on June 17, 1943. He went through recruit training at the Marine Corps Recruit Depot San Diego, California, and then, at his own request, was sent to the Marine Raiders at Camp Pendleton, California. After three weeks, Gonsalves was transferred to the artillery at the same camp. He was classified as a cannoneer on 75 and 105-millimeter guns before joining the 30th Replacement Battalion in the fall of 1943.

Overseas
Pvt. Gonsalves left the United States on November 8, 1943, and at the end of that month was assigned to the 2nd Pack Howitzer Battalion, which was then in Hawaii. He was promoted to private first class in March 1944 and with his battalion, became part of the 22nd Marine Regiment two months later.

Gonsalves participated in the assault, capture, and occupation of Engebi and Parry Islands, in the Marshall Islands. The 22nd Marines was cited by Major General Thomas E. Watson, commanding general of Tactical Group I, for their part in the Marshalls' Campaign. From Eniwetok, Gonsalves accompanied the 22nd Marines to Kwajalein, to Guadalcanal, back to Kwajelein and Eniwetok, then up to Guam in July where he took part in the liberation of that pre-war American island.

After Guam, the 22nd Marines returned to Guadalcanal. In November, Gonsalves was detached from the regiment and joined Battery L, 4th Battalion, 15th Marine Regiment, 6th Marine Division.

Okinawa
PFC Gonsalves landed with the 15th Marines on Okinawa on April 1, 1945. On April 15, he was a member of an eight-man forward observer team that directed artillery fire in support of an attack by the infantry on Japanese positions on Motobu Peninsula. When it finally became necessary for the team to advance to the actual front lines, the officer in charge took Gonsalves and one other man with him. Gonsalves was the acting Scout Sergeant of the team. He and the other Marine were to lay telephone lines for communication with the artillery battalion. As the team advanced to the front, they were brought under heavy enemy rifles, grenades, and mortar fire. Just as the three had reached the front lines, a Japanese grenade landed among them. It was less than a foot from them. Without a moment's hesitation, Gonsalves flung himself on the grenade, taking the full explosion. The other two Marines were not touched by grenade fragments and successfully completed their mission.

Post-World War II

Medal of Honor
The Medal of Honor, with citation signed by President Harry S. Truman, was presented on June 19, 1946, to PFC Gonsalves' sister in the presence of his parents at ceremonies in the office of the commanding general of the Department of the Pacific, Major General Henry Louis Larsen, USMC in San Francisco, California.

Burial
PFC Gonsalves' remains were returned to the United States for reinternment after the war. He was buried with full military honors in Golden Gate National Cemetery in San Bruno, California, on March 20, 1949.

Namesake
In 1958, the Northern Training Area, a US Marine Corps training base located in 20,000 acres (80 km2) of single and double canopy jungle on the northern end of Okinawa, was named after PFC Gonsalves in 1986. Its name was later changed in 1998 to the Marine Corps Jungle Warfare Training Center.

Gonsalves Avenue, on MCAS Miramar, was named after him after the Marine Corps assumed control in 1997.

Medal of Honor citation

The President of the United States takes pride in presenting the MEDAL OF HONOR posthumously to

for service as set forth in the following CITATION:
For conspicuous gallantry and intrepidity at the risk of his life above and beyond the call of duty as Acting Scout Sergeant of a Forward Observer Team, serving with Battery L, Fourth Battalion, Fifteenth Marines, Sixth Marine Division, during action against enemy Japanese forces in Okinawa Shima in the Ryūkyū Chain, 15 April 1945. Undaunted by the powerfully organized opposition encountered on Motobu Peninsula during a fierce assault waged by a Marine infantry battalion against a Japanese strong-hold, Private First Class Gonsalves repeatedly braved the terrific hostile bombardment to aid his Forward Observation Team in directing well-placed artillery fire and, when his commanding officer determined to move into the front lines in order to register a more effective bombardment in the enemy's defensive position, unhesitatingly advanced uphill with the officer and another Marine despite a slashing barrage of enemy mortar and rifle fire. As they reached the front, a Japanese grenade fell close within the group. Instantly Private First Class Gonsalves dived on the deadly missile, absorbing the exploding charge in his own body and thereby protecting the others from serious and perhaps fatal wounds. Stouthearted and indomitable, Private First Class Gonsalves readily yielded his own chances of survival that his fellow Marines might carry on the relentless battle against the fanatic Japanese and his cool decision, prompt action and valiant spirit of self-sacrifice in the face of certain death reflect the highest credit upon himself and the United States Naval Service. He gallantly gave his life in the service of his country.
/S/ HARRY S. TRUMAN

Military decoration & awards
 Medal of Honor
 Purple Heart Medal
 Combat Action Ribbon
 Presidential Unit Citation
 Navy Unit Commendation with gold 5/16 inch star
 American Campaign Medal
 Asiatic-Pacific Campaign Medal with bronze service star
 World War II Victory Medal

See also

 List of Medal of Honor recipients
 List of Medal of Honor recipients for World War II
 List of Hispanic Medal of Honor recipients
 Hispanics in the United States Marine Corps
 Hispanic Americans in World War II

References

 
 

1926 births
1945 deaths
United States Marine Corps Medal of Honor recipients
United States Marines
United States Marine Corps personnel killed in World War II
World War II recipients of the Medal of Honor
Burials at Golden Gate National Cemetery
Deaths by hand grenade
United States Marine Corps reservists